Arlington Fire may refer to:
 Arlington Fire District - The fire district that provides fire protection to the Town of Poughkeepsie
 Arlington County Fire Department - A county wide fire district in Arlington County, Virginia